Das Dreimäderlhaus is a Viennese operetta based on the 1912 Rudolf Hans Bartsch novel Schwammerl.

Das Dreimäderlhaus may also refer to the following adaptations:

 The House of Three Girls (1918 film) (German: Das Dreimäderlhaus), a German silent film directed by Richard Oswald
Blossom Time (1934 film), British film directed by Paul L. Stein
Three Girls for Schubert (Drei Mäderl um Schubert), 1936 German film directed by E.W. Emo
 The House of Three Girls (1958 film) (German: Das Dreimäderlhaus), an Austrian-West German musical film directed by Ernst Marischka

See also
 Lilac Time (disambiguation)